North Midlands (South) 2 (formerly North Midlands 2) was a tier 10 English Rugby Union league with teams from Birmingham, Herefordshire, Shropshire and Worcestershire taking part.  Promoted teams moved up to North Midlands 1 and since the cancellation of North Midlands 3 at the end of the 2003–04 season there was no relegation.  North Midlands (South) 2 was itself cancelled at the end of the 2005–06 campaign and the majority of teams transferred to the newly introduced Midlands 6 West (South-West).

Original teams

When league rugby began in 1987 this division contained the following teams:

Aston Old Edwardians
Bournville
Droitwich
Ludlow
Malvern
Old Centrals
Old Saltleians
Pershore
Shrewsbury
Telford Hornets
Woodrush

North Midlands 2 honours

North Midlands 2 (1987–1992)

The original North Midlands 1 was a tier 8 league involving clubs from Birmingham and the West Midlands.  Promotion was to North Midlands 1 and relegation to North Midlands 3.

North Midlands 2 (1992–1993)

Restructuring of the Midlands leagues saw North Midlands 2 drop two levels to become a tier 10 league.  Promotion continued to North Midlands 1 and relegation to North Midlands 3.

North Midlands 2 (1993–1996)

The top six teams from Midlands 1 and the top six from North 1 were combined to create National 5 North, meaning that North Midlands 2 dropped another level to become a tier 11 league.  Promotion continued to North Midlands 1 and relegation to North Midlands 3.

North Midlands 2 (1996–2000)

At the end of the 1995–96 season National 5 North was discontinued and North Midlands 2 returned to being a tier 10 league.  Promotion continued to North Midlands 1 and the cancellation of North Midlands 3 meant that there was no relegation until this division was re-introduced ahead of the 1999–00 campaign.

North Midlands 2 (2000–2004)

Despite widespread Midlands league restructuring ahead of the 2000–01 season, North Midlands 2 remained at tier 10.  Promotion continued to North Midlands 1 and relegation to North Midlands 3.

North Midlands (South) 2 (2004–2006)

Restructuring for the 2004–05 season saw North Midlands 2 renamed as North Midlands (South) 2, remaining as a tier 10 division.  Promotion was to North Midlands (South) 1 and the cancellation of North Midlands 3 meant there was no longer relegation.  At the end of the 2005–06 the division was cancelled and the majority of teams transferred into the new Midlands 6 West (South-West).

Number of league titles

Stourport (2)
Aston Old Edwardians (1)
Birmingham City Officials (1)
Bredon Star (1)
Droitwich (1)
Edwardians (1)
Erdington (1)
Ledbury (1)
Old Griffinians (1)
Old Halesonians (1)
Selly Oak (1)
Shrewsbury (1)
Solihull (1)
Tenbury (1)
Veseyans (1)
Yardley & District (1)

Notes

See also
North Midlands 1
North Midlands 3
North Midlands 4
Midlands RFU
North Midlands RFU
English rugby union system
Rugby union in England

References

External links
 North Midlands RFU website

10
Rugby union in Herefordshire
Rugby union in Shropshire
Rugby union in Worcestershire
Sport in Birmingham, West Midlands
Sports leagues established in 1987
Sports leagues disestablished in 2006